Clinton County is a county located in the U.S. state of Missouri and is part of the Kansas City metropolitan area. As of the 2010 U.S. Census, the county had a population of 20,743. Its county seat is Plattsburg. The county was organized January 2, 1833 and named for Governor DeWitt Clinton of New York. The county seat of Plattsburg derives its name from a town of a similar name that is the county seat of Clinton County, New York, which was also named for the Governor.

Geography

Adjacent counties
DeKalb County (north)
Caldwell County (east)
Ray County (southeast)
Clay County (south)
Platte County (southwest)
Buchanan County (west)

Major highways
 Interstate 35
 U.S. Route 69
 U.S. Route 169
 Route 33
 Route 116

Demographics

As of the census of 2017, there were 20,554 people, 8,990 households, and 8,299 families residing in the county. The population density was 49.5 people per square mile (18/km2). There were 7,877 housing units at an average density of 19 per square mile (7/km2). The racial makeup of the county was 95.5% White, 1.4% Black or African American, 0.7% Native American, 0.4% Asian, 0.01% Pacific Islander, 0.27% from other races, and 1.9% from two or more races. Approximately 2.1% of the population were Hispanic or Latino of any race.

There were 7,152 households, out of which 34.90% had children under the age of 18 living with them, 61.40% were married couples living together, 8.80% had a female householder with no husband present, and 25.90% were non-families. 22.00% of all households were made up of individuals, and 10.50% had someone living alone who was 65 years of age or older. The average household size was 2.59 and the average family size was 3.03.

In the county, the population was spread out, with 26.80% under the age of 18, 7.40% from 18 to 24, 28.20% from 25 to 44, 23.50% from 45 to 64, and 14.10% who were 65 years of age or older. The median age was 38 years. For every 100 females there were 96.00 males. For every 100 females age 18 and over, there were 91.60 males.

The median income for a household in the county was $57,486, and the median income for a family was $48,244. Males had a median income of $36,307 versus $22,991 for females. The per capita income for the county was $19,056. About 7.30% of families and 9.30% of the population were below the poverty line, including 11.30% of those under age 18 and 12.70% of those age 65 or over.

2020 Census

Education

Public schools
Cameron R-I School District – Cameron
Parkview Elementary School (PK-04)
Cameron Middle School (05-08)
Cameron High School (09-12)
Clinton County R-III School District – Plattsburg
Ellis Elementary School (PK-04)
Clinton County Middle School (05-08)
Plattsburg High School (09-12)
East Buchanan County C-1 School District – Gower
East Buchanan County Elementary School (PK-05)
East Buchanan County Middle School (06-08)
East Buchanan County High School (09-12)
Lathrop R-II School District – Lathrop
Lathrop Elementary School (K-05)
Lathrop Middle School (06-08)
Lathrop High School (09-12)

Public libraries
Cameron Public Library

Politics

Local
The Republican Party predominantly controls politics at the local level in Clinton County. Republicans hold all but one of the elected positions in the county.

State

Clinton County is split into two Missouri House of Representatives District numbers 8 & 9. This change occurred after the mandatory redistricting caused by the 2020 census.

All of Clinton County is a part of Missouri's 12th District in the Missouri Senate and is currently represented by Dan Hegeman (R-Cosby).

Federal

All of Clinton County is included in Missouri's 6th Congressional District and is currently represented by Sam Graves (R-Tarkio) in the U.S. House of Representatives.

Communities

Cities
Cameron (partly in DeKalb County)
Gower (partly in Buchanan County)
Holt (partly in Clay County)
Lathrop
Lawson (mostly in Clay and Ray Counties)
Osborn (partly in DeKalb County)
Plattsburg (county seat)
Trimble

Village
Turney

Census-designated places
Grayson
Lake Arrowhead

Other unincorporated places
Barnesville
Braley
Converse
Haynesville
Hemple
Lilly
Mecca
Perrin
Starfield

References

External links
 Digitized 1930 Plat Book of Clinton County  from University of Missouri Division of Special Collections, Archives, and Rare Books

 
Missouri counties
1833 establishments in Missouri
Populated places established in 1833